The Churnet Valley line was one of the three original routes planned and built by the North Staffordshire Railway. The line was closed in several stages between 1964 and 1988 but part of the central section passed into the hands of a preservation society and today operates as the Churnet Valley Railway.

Origins
Various proposals were put forward for a line through the Churnet Valley in the 1830s and in 1841 plans were published by the Manchester & Derby Railway (Churnet Valley) Company for a line from Macclesfield to Derby via Leek, Cheadle, Rocester and Uttoxeter.  At Macclesfield the line would connect with the Grand Junction Railway and at Derby with the North Midland Railway and would result a direct route between Manchester and London.  In 1844 the company by now renamed simply the Churnet Valley Railway Company laid out its prospectus for construction of the line in 1844 and following approval of the plan by the Board of Trade preparation was made for the necessary approval of Parliament to be sought.

As the draft bill was being considered by the House of Commons the directors of the company agreed an amalgamation with the Trent Valley Railway and the Staffordshire Potteries Railway to form the Churnet, Potteries and Trent Junction Railway, soon to be called the North Staffordshire Railway (NSR).  The Churnet Valley bill was withdrawn and in 1846 a new bill was submitted to Parliament entitled the North Staffordshire Railway (Churnet Valley Line) Bill.

The merger of the three companies had not been without opposition and many shareholders of the Churnet Valley company were worried that the Churnet Valley line would become a small adjunct to the other NSR lines between Derby–Crewe and Macclesfield–Colwich. After negotiation it became a stipulation of the bill that the dividend of the NSR could not exceed 5% until the Churnet Valley line was fully open.  With this concession granted the bill proceeded through Parliament and received royal assent on 26 June 1846.  Allocated capital for the lines was £1,200,000.

Construction
The tender for construction of the line was let in 1847 to J & S Tredwell for a price of £330,218. Construction began in September 1847 and in November 1847 a champagne party was held  underground to celebrate the laying of the first brick in Nab Hill tunnel near Leek.  Work on the section south of Leek involved diverting the River Churnet at Consall and also one of the first instance of a canal being converted into a railway with closure of the Uttoxeter Canal and it being used as the track bed between Froghall and Uttoxeter.  The conversion had been made possible by the acquisition of the Trent and Mersey Canal and its subsidiaries, the Caldon Canal and the Uttoxeter Canal, by the NSR as part of the 1846 act.  Work on the line was concluded in 1849 and the line of  opened to both passenger and goods traffic on 13 July 1849.

Operation
Although originally planned as a main route between Manchester and Derby the line became, as many shareholders had worried, something of a backwater. Through trains required co-operation with the LNWR, something that the NSR did not have for many years and when good relations with the LNWR were settled, some through services were run but not as many as once anticipated.

Train services settled to a small number of local trains between Macclesfield and Uttoxeter supplemented by a smaller number of slightly shorter workings e.g. Macclesfield—Leek.  A lot of excursions were run over the line as the NSR made efforts to promote Rudyard Lake as a tourist destination. The lake, actually a reservoir, supplied water to the Trent & Mersey Canal and had therefore become the property of the NSR in 1846.  However the NSR only owned the lake, not the land around it and protracted legal proceedings meant that the NSR were not fully able to promote Rudyard until the early part of the 20th century. Another important tourist destination for the NSR was also served by the line; Alton Towers, owned by the Earl of Shrewsbury, was open to the public on several days during the summer and the NSR provided special trains on these occasions.

The NSR were not the only group seeking to promote the Churnet Valley as a tourist destination and through the efforts of a number of local hoteliers the valley became known as "Little Switzerland".  Despite the picturesque description which arose from the valley's steep sides, the area was also an important site in the mineral industry with iron and copper as well as limestone and sandstone being quarried. Previously carried by canal, the output from the quarries and the associated industries was moved by rail especially when the NSR opened a line from Stoke to Leek in 1867. Principal among these were the copper wire works at Froghall and Oakamoor and the limestone quarries at Caldon Low. The latter was also owned by the NSR and moved stone from the quarry to Froghall station via a  narrow gauge railway. At one point over 1000 tons a week was being shipped from Froghall to Brunner Mond.

London Midland Scottish years
Along with the rest of the NSR the line passed into the ownership of the London, Midland and Scottish Railway (LMS) which made little change to the operation of the line.  Passenger services remained much as they had done under the NSR, but Alton Towers became an increasingly popular tourist destination and frequent excursions terminated there. Further north, at Rudyard, there were quite a few changes as the LMS sold off the golf club and the Rudyard Hotel. One result was a confusing change of station names; Rudyard Lake was renamed Cliffe Park, and Rudyard was renamed Rudyard Lake.

One long-distance train ran over the line, the Saturdays-only Eastern Counties Express between Manchester and Cromer ran in both directions along the Churnet Valley, stopping only at Leek to pick up/set down passengers to or from beyond Nottingham.

Freight traffic suffered from the effects of the Great Depression, the most notable casualty being the cessation of operations at Caldon Low quarries, although they subsequently re-opened when the LMS found a lessee for the quarry.  The narrow gauge line between the quarry and Froghall closed in 1936 and all output was shipped via the Waterhouses branch, which left the Churnet Valley line at Leekbrook Junction.

Wartime services
With the outbreak of World War II the line as with most British railways moved to an emergency timetable. The Churnet Valley was unusual in that the basic service was improved in terms of number of services even if the timings were slower. The increase in services was due to Bolton's at Froghall being an important munitions site and Alton Towers becoming 121 Officer Cadet Training Unit, Royal Artillery.

British Railways
Following nationalisation, the line became part of the London Midland Region of British Railways. Passenger services remained fairly consistent with the wartime levels of five 'up' trains and six 'down' trains a day with additional workmen's services between Leek and Uttoxeter.  Falling passenger numbers throughout the 1950s led to a proposal in 1959 for the withdrawal of all advertised passenger services between Macclesfield and Uttoxeter and the retention of the non-advertised workmen's services between Leek and Uttoxeter only.  Despite objections the proposal was implemented on 7 November 1960. This did not stem the financial losses on the line, and the entire line between Leek and North Rode closed in June 1964.  At the same time local goods facilities were withdrawn at all other stations except Leek followed in January 1965 by the withdrawal of the passenger service over the south section between Leek and Uttoxeter and the closure of the line south of Oakamoor.

This left the line with public goods services from Leek to Stoke and bulk sand traffic from Oakamoor. The Leek services lasted until 1970 when the line between Leek and Leek Brook Junction closed but the Oakamoor sand traffic continued until 1988.

Preservation

In 1971 a preservation society, the Cheshire and Staffordshire Railway Society, were looking for a site. One of their first possible locations was the section of line between Rudyard and Leek but this fell through with the demolition of the Leek station buildings in 1973.

Despite not having access to the track through the station, as this was then part of the line to the Sand Sidings at Oakamoor, the members established a small heritage site. However, with the withdrawal of the last goods services from Oakamoor in 1988, the society was able to take over the line and commence bigger operations.

Since then the society has reopened the railway stations at Cheddleton, Consall and Kingsley & Froghall.

Another  section of the trackbed is occupied by the Rudyard Lake Steam Railway, a  gauge tourist line which runs beside Rudyard Lake. It was established in 1985 by Peter Hanton of Congleton, who completed its construction in 1993, but sold it to an operating company in 2000 due to poor health.

Notes

References

Closed railway lines in the West Midlands (region)
North Staffordshire Railway
Staffordshire Moorlands
Railway lines opened in 1848
History of Staffordshire
Rail transport in Staffordshire
Rail transport in Cheshire
Standard gauge railways in England